Rodrigo Rosario (born March 4, 1978 in San Pedro de Macorís, Dominican Republic), is a former professional baseball player. A pitcher, Rosario made his Major League Baseball debut in 2003 for the Houston Astros. His rookie season was limited to two starts. His debut was a win versus the Texas Rangers but had to leave his second start in the second inning because of shoulder tightness. Ultimately he required surgery to repair partial tears of his rotator cuff and biceps tendon.

Notes

External links

1978 births
Dominican Republic expatriate baseball players in the United States
Houston Astros players
Living people
Major League Baseball pitchers
Major League Baseball players from the Dominican Republic
Sportspeople from San Pedro de Macorís